A mathematical sculpture is a sculpture which uses mathematics as an essential conception. Helaman Ferguson, George W. Hart, Bathsheba Grossman, Peter Forakis and Jacobus Verhoeff are well-known mathematical sculptors.

References

Mathematics and art
Sculpture